The 1973 St. Louis Cardinals season was the team's 92nd season in St. Louis, Missouri and its 82nd season in the National League. The Cardinals overcame an 8-23 start to finish with an 81–81 record during the season and finished second in the National League East,  games behind the NL East and eventual NL pennant winners New York Mets. To date, this is the only season the Cardinals have finished at .500 instead of above or below it.

Offseason 
 October 27, 1972: Jerry McNertney was released by the Cardinals.

Regular season 
Pitcher Bob Gibson won a Gold Glove this year.

Season standings

Record vs. opponents

Opening Day lineup

Notable transactions 
 May 8, 1973: Al Santorini was traded by the Cardinals to the Kansas City Royals for Tom Murphy.
 June 5, 1973: 1973 Major League Baseball Draft
John Tamargo was drafted by the Cardinals in the 6th round.
Eric Rasmussen was drafted by the Cardinals in the 32nd round.
Bryn Smith was drafted by the Cardinals in the 49th round, but did not sign. However, he would pitch for the team from 1990–1992.
 August 7, 1973: Wayne Granger was traded by the Cardinals to the New York Yankees for a player to be named later and cash. The Yankees completed the deal by sending Ken Crosby to the Cardinals on September 12.
 August 18, 1973: Dave Campbell and cash were traded by the Cardinals to the Houston Astros for Tommie Agee.
 August 29, 1973: Eddie Fisher was purchased by the St. Louis Cardinals from the Chicago White Sox.

Roster

Player stats

Batting

Starters by position 
Note: Pos = Position; G = Games played; AB = At bats; H = Hits; Avg. = Batting average; HR = Home runs; RBI = Runs batted in

Other batters 
Note: G = Games played; AB = At bats; H = Hits; Avg. = Batting average; HR = Home runs; RBI = Runs batted in

Pitching

Starting pitchers 
Note: G = Games pitched; IP = Innings pitched; W = Wins; L = Losses; ERA = Earned run average; SO = Strikeouts

Other pitchers 
Note: G = Games pitched; IP = Innings pitched; W = Wins; L = Losses; ERA = Earned run average; SO = Strikeouts

Relief pitchers 
Note: G = Games pitched; W = Wins; L = Losses; SV = Saves; ERA = Earned run average; SO = Strikeouts

Farm system 

LEAGUE CHAMPIONS: Tulsa, St. Petersburg

References

External links
1973 St. Louis Cardinals at Baseball Reference
1973 St. Louis Cardinals team page at www.baseball-almanac.com

St. Louis Cardinals seasons
Saint Louis Cardinals season
St Louis